SNPG can refer to:

 Scottish National Portrait Gallery
 Société Nationale Petrolière Gabonaise